Fumaria gaillardotii is a species of plant in the family Papaveraceae.

Sources

References 

gaillardotii
Flora of Malta